Poracanthium is a genus of trematodes in the family Opecoelidae.

Species
Poracanthium furcatum Dollfus, 1948
Poracanthium ghanense Fischthal & Thomas, 1970

References

Opecoelidae
Plagiorchiida genera